ISO 22398:2013, Societal security – Guidelines for exercises, is an international standard published by International Organization for Standardization that provide guidelines to be used for organizations that want to plan, conduct and improve exercises. The guidelines can also be used for a full exercise programme.

It can be used by all types and sizes of organizations, no matter whether they are private or public or what kind of business they operate  
.

Scope and contents 
ISO 22398 includes the following main clauses:
 Scope
 Normative references
 Terms and definitions
 Planning, conducting and improving an exercise programme
 Planning, conducting and improving exercise projects
 Continual improvement 
Annex A Exercises within a management system description
Annex B Needs analysis
Annex C National strategic exercises
Annex D Exercise enhancement

History 
This standard was originally developed by ISO technical committee ISO/TC 223 on societal security and published for the first time in September 2013.  
ISO/TC 292 Security and resilience took over the responsibility of the work when ISO/TC 223 was dissolved and initiated a revision of the standard. The standard was last reviewed and confirmed in 2022, therefore version 22398:2013 remains current.

See also 
 List of ISO standards
 International Organization for Standardization

External links 
 ISO 22398 — Societal security – Guidelines for exercises
 ISO TC 292 — Security and resilience
  ISO 22398 at www.isotc292online.org

References 

22398